Eric Quinn Metcalf (born January 23, 1968) is an American former professional football player who was primarily known as a return specialist, but played running back and wide receiver in the National Football League (NFL) for the Cleveland Browns, Atlanta Falcons, San Diego Chargers, Arizona Cardinals, Carolina Panthers, Washington Redskins and Green Bay Packers. He was a three-time Pro Bowl selection for the Browns and the Chargers. He was also the 1988 US Track and Field Champion in the long jump and a two-time NCAA Champion in the same event at the University of Texas.

High school career
Metcalf attended Bishop Denis J. O'Connell High School in Arlington County, Virginia. In high school Metcalf competed in both football and track and field. The records he set in the long jump, triple jump, 100, 200, and 400-yard dash still stand today.

College career
Metcalf attended and played college football at the University of Texas at Austin where he was an All-Southwest Conference selection three times. He was the 1987 Southwest Conference player of the year and a second-team All-American.  Metcalf finished his four seasons with 4,051 yards from scrimmage, 125 receptions, and 31 total touchdowns, while adding another 1,650 yards on special teams, with an average of 10 yards per punt return. He is the only player in Texas history to lead the team in all-purpose yards all four years. He holds every school receiving record for a running back.

Metcalf also had a distinguished career in track and field. In high school, he was a standout long jumper and sprinter, and still has the seventh longest distance ever posted indoors by an American high schooler with a jump of 7.75 meters. He also recorded personal bests of 10.54 seconds in the 100 meters and 21.34 in the 200 meters.

He set the University of Texas at Austin's long jump record (still current) at 8.44 meters (27'8"1/4). He won the NCAA National Long Jump Championship in 1986 and 1988 and the SWC Long Jump titles in 1986 and 1987. He was also the US Jr. National Long Jump Champion in 1986 and 1987. He earned the distinction of being a five-time All-American and in 1988 competed in the USA Olympic Trials, finishing 8th overall.

Professional career

A multi-talented player, Metcalf excelled at offense and as a returner on special teams. In his second NFL season, he led the league in kickoff return yards (1,052) and return touchdowns (two). He also led the NFL in punt return touchdowns in four different seasons (1993–1995, 1997). During his first six seasons with Cleveland, Metcalf was a running back and kickoff and punt returner. He set the rookie rushing record for the Browns and returned a kickoff for 101 yards in 1990. With the Browns he was an all-pro once and made the pro-bowl twice - once as a running back and once as a kickoff returner. 

In 1995 he was traded to the Falcons along with the Browns 1st Round draft pick (#26 overall) for Atlanta's 1st round draft pick (#10 overall). Atlanta moved him to slot receiver in their Run and Shoot offense where he led the team with 104 receptions for more than 1000 yards. At the end of the season, he became a free agent and signed with San Diego.

At San Diego he was again a receiver, and during his lone season there was again named an All-Pro and made the Pro Bowl, but this time as a WR, meaning he went to 3 pro-bowls at 3 different positions.  At the end of the season, the Chargers traded Metcalf, Patrick Sapp, the third and 33rd pick in the 1998 NFL Draft and their 1999 first-round pick to move up one spot to draft Ryan Leaf, often considered one of the worst trades in franchise history.

At Arizona, his playing time was down and didn't score a touchdown, but in the season finale, he returned a kickoff 46 yards to set up the game-winning field goal in a victory that sent Arizona to the playoffs. After one season with the Cardinals, Metcalf was signed and released by the Baltimore Ravens (which was the former Browns) during the summer and fall of 1999 and was then signed by the Carolina Panthers, where he was unhappy and unproductive.  He also became the first player in NFL history with 7,000 yards in offense and 7,000 yards in kick returns.

After sitting the 2000 season Metcalf was signed by the Oakland Raiders in the 2001 preseason and then released before the season started. In October he was signed by the Redskins. He had an 89 yard punt return for a touchdown, the longest in the NFL that season, that set the record for punt returns for a touchdown (since surpassed). He did not return to the Redskins.

Late in the 2002 season he was signed by the Packers for the last game of the season and the playoffs. Following the season he retired.

Overall, Metcalf finished his career with 2,392 rushing yards, 541 receptions for 5,572 yards, 3,453 punt return yards (5th best in history), and 5,813 yards returning kickoffs. This gave him a total of 17,230 all-purpose yards, ranking him 9th among at the time of his retirement (he had been as high as 7th earlier in his career). He also scored 55 touchdowns (12 rushing, 31 receiving, ten punt returns, two kickoff returns). His 12 returns for touchdowns are the third most in NFL history behind Devin Hester and Brian Mitchell.  Metcalf's 10 punt return touchdowns were an NFL record, until October 2, 2011, when Devin Hester broke it against the Carolina Panthers. Metcalf is 2nd all-time for punt returns. At the time of his retirement, he was 4th in Punt Return Yards, 8th in Kickoff returns, and 9th in Kickoff return yards.

In 2008 he was named a Cleveland Brown legend. He has been a Pro Football Hall of Fame nominee in multiple years, but never made it to semi-finalist.

NFL career statistics
Receiving statistics 

Rushing statistics

Returning statistics

Personal life

Metcalf coached football at Rainier Beach High School in Seattle, Washington; in the 2005–2006 season he helped lead the team to the state semi-finals. He also started an elite high school track and field club called Seatown Express. Metcalf has also assisted with coaching the University of Washington track and field team.

References

External links
 

1968 births
Living people
American football return specialists
American football running backs
American football wide receivers
American male long jumpers
Arizona Cardinals players
Atlanta Falcons players
Carolina Panthers players
Cleveland Browns players
Green Bay Packers players
San Diego Chargers players
Texas Longhorns football players
Texas Longhorns men's track and field athletes
Washington Redskins players
High school football coaches in Washington (state)
American Conference Pro Bowl players
Sportspeople from Arlington County, Virginia
Players of American football from Seattle
Players of American football from Virginia
African-American coaches of American football
African-American players of American football
21st-century African-American people
20th-century African-American sportspeople